Montjean may refer to the following places in France:

 Montjean, Charente, a commune in the Charente department
 Montjean, Mayenne, a commune in the Mayenne department